Raffaele Piria (Scilla 20 August 1814 – Turin 18 July 1865) was an Italian chemist from Scilla, who lived in Palmi. He converted the substance Salicin into a sugar and a second component, which on oxidation becomes salicylic acid, a major component of the analgesic drug Aspirin (acetylsalicylic acid). Other reactions discovered by Piria were the conversion of aspartic acid to malic acid by action of nitrogen dioxide, and the reaction of aromatic nitro compounds with sulfite towards aminosulfonic acids.

References

Italian chemists
People from Scilla, Calabria
People from Palmi
1814 births
1865 deaths
Academic staff of the University of Pisa